Garrett Seaton "Garry" Meadows (15 April 1939 – 22 July 1982) was an Australian television presenter, radio announcer, and actor.

Career

Stage
Meadows began acting in Perth during his youth in the 1950s when he appeared in a number of local stage productions.  His stage credits included a starring role in Small Hotel in 1957.  He also appeared in productions of The Importance of Being Earnest, The Teahouse of the August Moon, The Rising Generation, Ten Little Niggers and The Taming of the Shrew.

Although he ultimately became known for hosting television game shows, Meadows also acted in a number of television programs including The Bluestone Boys, Bobby Dazzler, Bluey, Homicide and Prisoner.  Meadows also appeared in the movie Mad Dog Morgan.

Radio
Meadows' radio career began in 1959 when he commenced working at Perth's 6IX.  From there, Meadows went on to work at a number of radio stations including Perth's 6PR where Meadows was credited as being one of the first announcers to use the talkback format.  He was also live on air at 6PR during the 1968 Meckering earthquake.

He also worked at 2KO in Newcastle, 7HO and 7HT in Hobart, and 3DB in Melbourne.

Television
In 1960, Meadows joined Perth station TVW as a news presenter and host of music show Teenbeat. He left TVW at the end of 1961 but returned to the station in 1967 to host Spellbound, In Perth Tonight and Perth's New Faces.  Meadows also co-hosted the Perth Telethon in 1968.

Meadows won the Logie Award for Best Male Personality in Western Australia at both the 1970 and 1971 Logie Awards.

During the 1970s, Meadows moved on to host national television programs, most notably The Price Is Right.

Meadows also hosted High Rollers, Let's Make a Deal, and The Marriage Game.

In 1980, Meadows worked as a producer on Sale of the Century.

Death
Meadows died at the age of 43 on 22 July 1982 after suffering a heart attack outside the 3DB studios in Melbourne, as he was walking into the building to begin his shift.

He had been working at 3DB for less than a week when he died.

References

External links

1939 births
1982 deaths
20th-century Australian male actors
Australian male television actors
Australian male film actors
Australian radio presenters
Australian game show hosts
Male actors from Perth, Western Australia